Gabriel Montaperto (born 6 September 1997) is an Italian footballer who plays as a goalkeeper.

Club career
He made his Serie C debut for Olbia on 27 August 2016 in a game against Renate.

On 31 July 2017, he joined Fondi on loan.

References

External links
 

1997 births
People from Lodi, Lombardy
Footballers from Lombardy
Living people
Italian footballers
U.S. Pergolettese 1932 players
Cagliari Calcio players
Olbia Calcio 1905 players
F.C. Südtirol players
S.S. Racing Club Fondi players
Serie C players
Serie D players
Association football goalkeepers
Sportspeople from the Province of Lodi